Thauron is a commune in the Creuse department in the Nouvelle-Aquitaine region in central France.

Geography

Population

Sights
 The church, dating from the fifteenth century.
 The ruins of the thirteenth-century church of the abbey du Palais.
 The chapel de Bonneville
 The chapel in the park du Palais
 A monument to members of the French Resistance at the crossroads of the hamlet of Combeauvert.

See also
Communes of the Creuse department

References

Communes of Creuse